Aleksandr Valentinovich Zhidkov (born 9 April 1966) is a former Russian professional footballer.

Club career
He made his professional debut in the Soviet Second League in 1983 for FC Spartak Oryol.

Honours
 USSR Federation Cup winner: 1988.
 USSR Federation Cup finalist: 1990.
 Russian Premier League runner-up: 1993.

References

1966 births
Living people
Soviet footballers
Russian footballers
Association football midfielders
Russian Premier League players
FC Kairat players
FC Aktobe players
FC Dnipro players
FC Rotor Volgograd players
PFC Krylia Sovetov Samara players
FC Saturn Ramenskoye players
FC Sokol Saratov players
FC Metallurg Lipetsk players
FC Oryol players